The Daughters of Bilitis , also called the DOB or the Daughters, was the first lesbian civil and political rights organization in the United States. The organization, formed in San Francisco in 1955, was conceived as a social alternative to lesbian bars, which were subject to raids and police harassment. As the DOB gained members, their focus shifted to providing support to women who were afraid to come out. The DOB educated them about their rights, and about gay history. The historian Lillian Faderman declared, "Its very establishment in the midst of witch-hunts and police harassment was an act of courage, since members always had to fear that they were under attack, not because of what they did, but merely because of who they were." The Daughters of Bilitis endured for 14 years, becoming an educational resource for lesbians, gay men, researchers and mental health professionals.

Background
After World War II, anti-communist sentiments quickly became associated with the personal secrets of people who worked for the US government. Congress began to require the registration of members of "subversive groups." In 1950, the State Department declared homosexuals to be security risks (because of vulnerability to blackmail), and what followed was a succession of more repressive acts that included the dismissal of federal, state and local government employees suspected of being homosexual; politically motivated police raids on gay bars all over the US and Canada; even the enactment of laws prohibiting cross-dressing for men and women. More specifically regarding San Francisco's history where the Daughters of Bilitis were founded, there were police raids specifically on lesbian bars like Adler and Tommy's place, both occurring on September 8, 1954.

History

In 1955, Del Martin and Phyllis Lyon had been together as lovers for three years when they complained to a gay male couple that they did not know any other lesbians. The gay couple introduced Martin and Lyon to another lesbian couple, one of whom, a Filipina woman, named Rosalie "Rose" Bamberger, suggested they create a social club. The original founding couples met on September 21, 1955. Attendees included: Rose Bamberger and Rosemary Sliepen, Del Martin and Phyllis Lyon, Marcia Foster and her partner June, as well as Noni Frey and her partner Mary. Rose and Rosemary, who were both working class and employed at brush-manufacturing factories, hosted the meeting in their home. One of the priorities of the founding members was to have a place to dance, as dancing with the same sex in a public place was illegal. Martin and Lyon recalled later, "Women needed privacy...not only from the watchful eye of the police, but from gaping tourists in the bars and from inquisitive parents and families." Although unsure of how exactly to proceed with the group, they began to meet regularly, realized they should be organized, and quickly elected Martin as president. From the start they had a clear focus to educate other women about lesbians, and reduce their self-loathing brought on by the socially repressive times.

Naming

The name of the newfound club was chosen in its second meeting. Bilitis is the name given to a fictional lesbian contemporary of Sappho by the French poet Pierre Louÿs in his 1894 work The Songs of Bilitis, in which Bilitis lived on the Isle of Lesbos alongside Sappho. The name was chosen for its obscurity; even Martin and Lyon did not know what it meant. "Daughters" was meant to evoke association with other American social associations such as the Daughters of the American Revolution. Early DOB members felt they had to follow two contradictory approaches: trying to recruit interested potential members and being secretive. Martin and Lyon justified the name, writing later, "If anyone asked us, we could always say we belong to a poetry club." They also designed a pin to wear to be able to identify with others, chose club colors and voted on the motto "Qui vive", French for "on alert". The organization filed a charter for non-profit corporation status in 1957, writing a description so vague, Phyllis Lyon remembered, "it could have been a charter for a cat-raising club."

Mission

Within a year of its creation, most of the original eight participants were no longer part of the group, but their numbers had grown to 16, and they decided they wanted to be more than only a social alternative to bars. Of the original participants, several working-class women were not comfortable going public when DOB began. They subsequently left DOB and went on to form two secret groups for lesbians, Quatrefoil and Hale Aikane. Historian Marcia Gallo writes "They recognized that many women felt shame about their sexual desires and were afraid to admit them. They knew that...without support to develop the self-confidence necessary to advocate for one's rights, no social change would be possible for lesbians."

By 1959 there were chapters of the DOB in New York City, Los Angeles, Chicago, and Rhode Island along with the original chapter in San Francisco. Upon arrival at a meeting, attendees would be greeted at the door.  In a show of good faith, the greeter would say, "I'm ---. Who are you? You don't have to give me your real name, not even your real first name."

Soon after forming, the DOB wrote a mission statement that addressed the most significant problem Martin and Lyon had faced as a couple: the complete lack of information about female homosexuality in what historian Martin Meeker termed "the most fundamental journey a lesbian has to make." When the club realized they were not allowed to advertise their meetings in the local newspaper, Lyon and Martin, who both had backgrounds in journalism, began to print a newsletter to distribute to as many women as the group knew. In October 1956 it became The Ladder, the first nationally distributed lesbian publication in the U.S. and one of the first to publish statistics on lesbians, when they mailed surveys to their readers in 1958 and 1964. Martin was the first president and Lyon became the editor of The Ladder.

The DOB advertised itself as "A Woman's Organization for the purpose of Promoting the Integration of the Homosexual into Society." The statement was composed of four parts that prioritized the purpose of the organization, and it was printed on the inside of the cover of every issue of The Ladder until 1970:

 Education of the variant...to enable her to understand herself and make her adjustment to society...this to be accomplished by establishing...a library...on the sex deviant theme; by sponsoring public discussions...to be conducted by leading members of the legal psychiatric, religious and other professions; by advocating a mode of behavior and dress acceptable to society.
 Education of the public...leading to an eventual breakdown of erroneous taboos and prejudices...
 Participation in research projects by duly authorized and responsible psychologists, sociologists, and other such experts directed towards further knowledge of the homosexual.
 Investigation of the penal code as it pertain to the homosexual, proposal of changes,...and promotion of these changes through the due process of law in the state legislatures.

New York chapter president Barbara Gittings noted that the word "variant" was used instead of "lesbian" in the mission statement because "lesbian" was a word that had a very negative connotation in 1956.

Methods

The early gay rights movement, then called the Homophile Movement, was centered around the Mattachine Society, formed in 1950. Although the Mattachine Society began as a provocative organization with roots in its founders' communist activism, leadership of the Mattachine thought it more prudent and productive to convince heterosexual society at large that gays were not different from themselves rather than to agitate for change. They changed their tactics in 1953. The Daughters of Bilitis followed this model by encouraging its members to assimilate as much as possible into the prevailing heterosexual culture.

This was reflected in ongoing debate over the propriety of butch and femme dress and role play among its members. As early as 1955 a rule was made that women who attended meetings, if wearing pants, should be wearing women's slacks. However, many women remember it being a rule that went unfollowed as attendees at many meetings were wearing jeans, and the only jeans available in the 1950s were men's. Barbara Gittings recalled years later an instance when, in preparation for a national convention, members of the DOB persuaded a woman who had worn men's clothing all her life "to deck herself out in as 'feminine' a manner as she could... Everyone rejoiced over this as though some great victory had been accomplished... Today we would be horrified at anyone who thought this kind of evangelism had a legitimate purpose."

The Daughters of Bilitis were used as political fodder in the 1959 mayoral race in San Francisco. Russell Wolden, challenging incumbent George Christopher, distributed information implying that Christopher was making the city safe for "sex deviants". Wolden was responsible for materials that stated, "You parents of daughters — do not sit back complacently feeling that because you have no boys in your family everything is all right... To enlighten you as to the existence of a Lesbian organization composed of homosexual women, make yourself acquainted with the name Daughters of Bilitis." There were only two copies of the subscription list of The Ladder, a deliberate attempt to discourage its getting into the hands of anyone who might use it against the subscribers. DOB leaders moved the list from its headquarters and later found out that San Francisco police had searched the office after its removal. Even the FBI was curious enough to attend meetings to report in 1959, "The purpose of the DOB is to educate the public to accept the Lesbian homosexual into society."

National conventions

In 1960, the DOB held their first convention in San Francisco. Press releases announcing the convention were sent to local radio and newspapers, prompting San Francisco Chronicle columnist Herb Caen to direct a jab at Russell Wolden and publicize the convention, writing: "Russ Wolden, if no one else, will be interested to learn that the Daughters of Bilitis will hold their nat'l convention here May 27–30. They're the female counterparts of the Mattachine Society — and one of the convention highlights will be an address by Atty. Morris Lowenthal titled, 'The Gay Bar in the Courts.' Oh brother. I mean sister. Come to think of it, I don't know what I mean...." The blurb was reprinted in the March issue of The Ladder.

Two hundred women attended the conference, as did the San Francisco police, who came to check if any of the DOB members were wearing men's clothes. Del Martin brought them inside to see all the women wearing dresses, stockings and heels. The attendees listened to speakers, including a debate between two attorneys about the legality and morality of gay bars, a presentation by the American Civil Liberties Union, and an Episcopal priest who "served up damnation with dessert", as he went on a "tirade" reminding the audience they were sinners, to which they listened politely. The DOB also gave awards to men who were allied with them, whom they called "Sons of Bilitis", or SOBs, including their lawyer, photographer, and members of the Mattachine Society who assisted them with the convention.

The second national convention, held in 1962, was also notable for its being covered on television on the KTTV's Confidential File, a nationally syndicated show; this was probably the first American national broadcast that specifically covered lesbianism. The DOB held further conventions every two years until 1968. Cleo Bonner, under the name Cleo Glenn, gave the welcoming address at the 1964 convention.

Change in direction

In 1960, letters from readers in The Ladder appeared that expressed exasperation with the emphasis on conformity in the DOB. In the 1970s, Del Martin and Phyllis Lyon reflected that by contemporary standards, the early ideals of the DOB for integration and adjustment of the lesbian into society were outmoded, but they remembered that in the 1950s and early 1960s many gay men and lesbians considered those ideals unreachable and this approach radical. The DOB never had the number of members comparable to the Mattachine Society's. Although some may have considered the DOB's ideals unrealistic, some also considered them too tame.

In 1961 the largest raid on a gay bar in San Francisco resulted in the arrests of 100 people, and the police forced women arrested in another raid in Chicago to disrobe to prove they were not wearing men's underwear, bringing a call in The Ladder to be more active. "If we ever hope to win our battle, we must fight. First, unshackle ourselves from fear, for it alone is our omnipresent enemy," read the report.

However, in 1962 at the Daughters' second convention, national president Jaye Bell again argued for the pragmatic approach of integration and patience with a slow criminal justice system. Two things happened in 1963 that changed the course of the organization. A windfall came to the group when an anonymous donor who refused for her name to be recorded, known only to the DOB as "Pennsylvania," began donating large sums of money to the DOB: $100,000 over five years. "Pennsylvania" wrote $3,000 checks to different DOB members, who in turn signed them over to the organization. The editorship of The Ladder changed from Del Martin to Barbara Gittings.

Because The Ladder was the primary method of communication from the leadership of the DOB to its individual chapters, the editor position was extremely influential in the group. Gittings made significant changes to the magazine, putting an emphasis on being more visible. One of Gittings's priorities was aligning the DOB with the East Coast Homophile Organizations (ECHO), a coalition of other social and political clubs for gays and lesbians. ECHO was established in January 1962, with its formative membership including the DOB chapter in New York, the Mattachine Society chapters in New York and Washington D.C., and the Janus Society. ECHO was meant to facilitate  cooperation between homophile organizations and outside administrations.

Evidence of how impatient audiences were getting with psychiatrists telling them they were mentally ill was displayed in 1964 when, at an ECHO convention, a featured speaker named Dr. Albert Ellis stated that "the exclusive homosexual is a psychopath" to which someone in the audience responded, "Any homosexual who would come to you for treatment, Dr. Ellis, would have to be a psychopath!" a comment that was met with applause.

In 1964, Martin and Lyon began to control less of the organization, saying, "We felt that if the organization had any validity at all it couldn't be based on two people, it had to be able to stand and grow on its own. And it was never going to do it if we didn't move out." Martin and Lyon joined the newly formed Council on Religion and the Homosexual (CRH) to develop a dialogue between organized religion and gays and lesbians. They urged the DOB to join the organization as well, but a previous rule precluding the DOB from joining separate organizations (set in place primarily to ensure it would not join organizations that sympathized with Communist aims) precluded it from doing so. However, the DOB did collaborate with the CRH at times. Most notably, on the eve of January 1, 1965, several homophile organizations in San Francisco, California, including the DOB, the CRH, the Society for Individual Rights, and the Mattachine Society, held a fund-raising ball for their mutual benefit at California Hall on Polk Street. San Francisco police had agreed not to interfere; however, on the evening of the ball, the police showed up in force and surrounded the California Hall and focused numerous klieg lights on the entrance to the hall. As each of the 600-plus persons entering the ball approached the entrance, the police took photographs.  A number of police vans were parked in plain view near the entrance to the ball. Evander Smith, a lawyer for the groups organizing the ball including the DOB, and Herb Donaldson tried to stop the police from conducting the fourth "inspection" of the evening; both were arrested along with two heterosexual lawyers, Elliott Leighton and Nancy May, who were supporting the rights of the participants to gather at the ball. But twenty-five of the most prominent lawyers in San Francisco joined the defense team for the four lawyers, and the judge directed the jury to find the four not guilty before the defense had even had a chance to begin their argumentation when the case came to court. This event has been called "San Francisco's Stonewall" by some historians; the participation of such prominent litigators in the defense of Smith, Donaldson and the other two lawyers marked a turning point in gay rights on the west coast of the United States.

The homophile movement was influenced by the successful activism of the civil rights movement (possibly partially because in 1964 Cleo Bonner, an African-American, was elected the DOB's national president) and higher-profile members of the DOB, such as Barbara Gittings, Del Martin and Phyllis Lyon, began to picket the White House, the State Department, and other federal buildings in 1965 and 1966 with members of the Mattachine Society. Gittings, as editor of The Ladder, encouraged others to do the same, and their activism became controversial in the leadership of the DOB. Gittings also ran a regular column in The Ladder that she called "Living Propaganda" encouraging women to come out to their friends and family members. It often included contributions from Frank Kameny urging political action. Some readers responded positively to Kameny, who in a speech declared homosexuals as normal as heterosexuals; some were put off by the political tone, and some were angered by Kameny, as a man, suggesting to them what they should do. DOB leaders disliked Kameny and the decisions Gittings was making for the magazine, and she was let go as editor in 1966.

Rise of feminism

Del Martin has written that the Daughters of Bilitis was a feminist organization from the beginning, focusing on the problems of women as well as problems of the female homosexual; however, in the mid-1960s feminism became a much higher priority to many of the women in the organization. In 1966, Del Martin and Phyllis Lyon joined the National Organization for Women, and urged readers of The Ladder to do the same, even reporting they got a family discount. The historian Martin Meeker points to the 1966 DOB convention that was a 10-day affair joining the DOB with the North American Conference of Homophile Organizations (NACHO) as the turning point where women's issues in the DOB began to have more importance to its members than gay issues. It was the largest convention DOB had yet organized, publicized in mass media all over San Francisco, attended by a large panel of nationally known speakers, and many of the presentations focused on topics that were exclusively male-centered.

A November 1966 essay by DOB president Shirley Willer pointed out the differences in problems faced by gay men and lesbians: gay men dealt more with police harassment, entrapment, solicitation, sex in public places, and until recently few women were being arrested for cross-dressing. Willer pointed out the problems specific to lesbians were job security and advancement, and family relationships, child custody, and visitation. Feeling as if their issues were not being addressed by homophile organizations, many members of the DOB began to say that lesbians had more in common with heterosexual women than men.

The Daughters were also affected by the changing times. Younger members did not share the concerns of older members; they were more moved by revolutionary tactics. (Though not all older members in the DOB were anti-radical; for example, as president of the New York chapter of the DOB, Ruth Simpson organized gay rights demonstrations as well as educational programs for DOB members during the period of 1969–71. Several times when NYC police, without warrants, illegally entered DOB's lesbian center in lower Manhattan, Simpson stood between the police and the DOB women. On three occasions she was cited for court appearances by the police.) Problems in the organization of the national governing board were becoming increasingly worse when local chapters were unable to take action on issues important to them without the approval of the national board. Members became disillusioned and left, and younger lesbians were more attracted to join feminist organizations. By the time the 1968 convention was held in Denver, less than two dozen women attended.

Controversial ending

Editing The Ladder was truly a full-time job. Longtime DOB member Helen Sandoz, who had taken over editing it after an interim period after Barbara Gittings left, was so burdened by the responsibilities that it was affecting her relationship. She passed it on to Barbara Grier in 1968, who had been contributing to the magazine as a book reviewer and poetry writer. Grier edited the magazine from Kansas City and was a relative newcomer to the workings of the DOB, despite contributing to the magazine since 1957.

Grier had high aspirations for The Ladder. She removed "A Lesbian Review" from the cover, placed there in 1964 by Gittings, to attract more women readers. She doubled the size of the magazine, expanding every section, and devoted much of the space in the magazine to feminist ideals. She reported the first DOB chapter in Australia in 1969 and attempts to form chapters in New Zealand and Scandinavia. In 1970, convinced that the DOB was falling apart and The Ladder must be saved, Barbara Grier worked with DOB president Rita LaPorte to take the subscriber list from the DOB headquarters in San Francisco to Reno and expand the magazine further.

There were only two copies of the subscription list. Despite assurances from The Ladder to subscribers that these names would be kept confidential, Rita LaPorte took the list of 3,800 names from DOB headquarters and the printers without telling anyone but Grier. When Del Martin and Phyllis Lyon discovered its loss, they assumed the police or FBI had confiscated it. Previous editors Martin, Lyon, Gittings, and Sandoz considered the act a theft. Because LaPorte took the list over state lines, pursuing it would have been a federal matter, and the Daughters did not have the resources to see it through. Grier severed ties with DOB leadership and in doing so took away the Daughters' primary method of communication from the national organization to its individual chapters. As a national organization, the Daughters of Bilitis folded in 1970, although some local chapters still continued until 1995. Grier also effectively ended The Ladder, despite her plans for the magazine to run on advertising (something The Ladder had not previously had) and subscriptions, when the $3,000 checks from "Pennsylvania" written to the DOB stopped coming. By 1972, The Ladder had run out of funds and it folded.

Dozens of other lesbian and feminist organizations were created in the wake of the Daughters of Bilitis. However, the impact of the 14-year run of the DOB on the lives of women was described by historian Martin Meeker thusly: "The DOB succeeded in linking hundreds of lesbians across the country with one another and gathering them into a distinctly modern communication network that was mediated through print and, consequently, imagination, rather than sight, sound, smell, and touch."

Organizational archives

The complete surviving organizational records of the national office and the San Francisco Chapter of the Daughters of Bilitis are available to researchers as part of the Phyllis Lyon and Del Martin Papers at the GLBT Historical Society, a nonprofit archives and research center in San Francisco. An online finding aid provides a detailed catalog of the collection.

The Lesbian Herstory Archives hosts the Red Dot Collection, which consists of the library of the New York City chapter of the Daughters of Bilitis.

Boston's The History Project archive houses the Boston Daughters of Bilitis Collection, which contains the Boston chapter's organization records, as well as the publication records of Boston DOB's magazine Maiden Voyage, later renamed Focus.

The University of California, Berkley Libraries houses a partial collection of digitized publications of the Daughter's publication, The Ladder; This collection includes Volumes 5–16. Alexander Street Libraries also houses a partial collection including Volumes 1-2 and 9–16.

See also

Beth Elliott
Cleo Bonner
Daughters of Bilitis (Australia)
History of lesbianism in the United States
Minorities Research Group
Ruth Simpson
The Ladder (magazine)

References

Notes

Bibliography
 Adam, Barry. Rise of a Gay and Lesbian Movement. Twayne Publishers; 1987 
 Charles, Douglas M. Hoover's War on Gays: Exposing the FBI's "Sex Deviates" Program. University Press of Kansas, 2015. 
 Faderman, Lillian. Odd Girls and Twilight Lovers: A History of Lesbian Life in Twentieth Century America. Penguin Books; 1991 
 Gallo, Marcia. Different Daughters: A History of the Daughters of Bilitis and the Rise of the Lesbian Rights Movement. Carrol & Graf Publishers, 2006. 
 Katz, Jonathan. Gay American History. Crowell Publishers; 1976 0690011652
 Meeker, Martin. Contacts Desired: Gay and Lesbian Communications and Community, 1940s-1970s. University of Chicago Press, 2006. 
 Tobin, Kay, Wicker, R. The Gay Crusaders. Arno Press, 1975

Further reading 
 Martin, Del and Phyllis Lyon. Lesbian/Woman, 1972. .
 Simpson, Ruth. From the Closet to the Courts. Washington, D.C.: Take Root Media, 2007.  .

Archival sources
 Daughters of Bilitis, Boston Chapter Records, 1974–1986 (1 linear foot) are housed at the Schlesinger Library, Radcliffe College
 Daughters of Bilitis papers, 1960-1965 (0.25 linear feet) are housed at the University of Minnesota Libraries.
 Barbara Gittings and Kay Tobin Lahusen gay history papers and photographs, 1855-2009 (bulk 1963-2007) (79 linear feet) are housed at the New York Public Library. Contains significant amounts of material created or accumulated during the creators' participation in the Daughters of Bilitis.

External links
The Songs of Bilitis
On Important Pre-Stonewall Activists(broken)
The Gay, Lesbian, Bisexual, Transgender Historical Society
Boyd, Nan Alamilla. Wide Open Town: A History of Queer San Francisco to 1965,  University of California Press, 2003.
Bullough, Vern L. Before Stonewall:  Activists for Gay and Lesbian Rights in Historical Context.  Harrington Park Press, 2002.
D'Emilio, John. Sexual Politics, Sexual Communities, University of Chicago Press, 1983.
Stein, Marc. City of Sisterly and Brotherly Loves: Lesbian and Gay Philadelphia, 1945-1972, Chicago: University of Chicago Press, 2000; reprinted by Temple University Press, 2004.
LGTBQ Places in Los Angeles: Daughters of Bilitis, Los Angeles Conservancy.

1950s in LGBT history
LGBT political advocacy groups in the United States
LGBT history in San Francisco
Lesbian feminist organizations
Lesbian history in the United States
Lesbian organizations in the United States
History of LGBT civil rights in the United States
History of women in California
Feminist organizations in the United States
Organizations established in 1955
Organizations disestablished in 1970
1955 establishments in California
1970 disestablishments in California
20th century in Los Angeles